Dactylastele is a genus of sea snails, marine gastropod mollusks in the family Calliostomatidae.

Species
Species within the genus Dactylastele include:

 Dactylastele burnupi (E.A. Smith, 1899)
 Dactylastele duplicata (A. Adams, 1851)
 Dactylastele nevilli (Sowerby, 1905)
 Dactylastele poupineli (Montrouzier in Souverbie & Montrouzier, 1875):

References

External links

 
Calliostomatidae